The Statue of The Republic is a  gilded bronze sculpture in Jackson Park, Chicago, Illinois by Daniel Chester French. The colossal original statue, a centerpiece of the  World's Columbian Exposition in 1893, was ordered to be destroyed by fire. The present statue is a smaller-scale replica, sculpted by the same artist, which was erected in 1918 in commemoration of both the 25th anniversary of the Exposition and the Illinois' statehood centennial. The statue is now located on the south end of the park at the intersection of East Hayes and South Richards Drive, adjacent the golf course and approximately where the exposition's Administration Building and Electricity Building once stood.  The statue was funded by the Benjamin Ferguson Fund, which commissioned French to cast this recreation of the original  statue that stood on the grounds of the Exposition of 1893. Edith Minturn Stokes served as French's model for the original statue. Henry Bacon, the architect of the Lincoln Memorial, designed the festooned pedestal for the replica statue.

The statue's right hand holds a globe, an eagle with wings spread perches on it. The other hand grasps a staff with a plaque that reads "", partly obscured by an encircling laurel wreath. The original at the Exposition had a Phrygian cap on top of the staff. The original was only partly gilded (no gold on the exposed skin of the head, neck and arms), but the new version is completely gilded.

The original statue for the Exposition, constructed in 1893, stood in front of the Court of Honor, inside the Great Basin (pool). However, on August 27, 1896 the statue was destroyed by fire under the order of the park commissioners.
The current statue stands in the area between the exposition's Electricity and Administration Buildings (both demolished after the exposition), now an intersection where Richards Drive joins Hayes Drive. One of two additional replicas of the statue stands in Forest Lawn Memorial Park in Glendale, California.

The statue is referred to by Chicago historians by the colloquial name of the "Golden Lady."  It was designated a Chicago Landmark on June 4, 2003.

See also
 List of public art in Chicago

References

External links 
 

1918 establishments in Illinois
1918 sculptures
Sculptures of birds in the United States
Bronze sculptures in Illinois
Buildings and structures completed in 1918
Buildings and structures in Chicago
Chicago Landmarks
Liberty symbols
Outdoor sculptures in Chicago
Sculptures by Daniel Chester French
Sculptures of women in Illinois
Statues in Chicago
World's Columbian Exposition
World's fair sculptures